The Battle of Kartarpur occurred on 25 April 1635  It started when the Mughal Empire attacked the town of Kartarpur, and was the last major battle of the Mughal-Sikh Wars during Guru Hargobind's period of Guruship.The Mughal force was repulsed by the Sikh defenders. The battle occurred in the locality of Kartarpur in present-day Jalandhar district of Indian Punjab.

Events 

Painda (or Painde) Khan, ex-general of the Sikh troops, convinced Shah Jahan to send a force against Guru Hargobind in Kartarpur. The expedition was commanded by Kale Khan, the governor of Peshwar who was assisted by Khans Qutub (Qutab or Kutub, the faujdar of Jalandhar) and Painda. Painda was accompanied by his son-in-law, Asman Khan.

Qutub sent Anwar Khan with gifts to Guru Hargobind which were rejected. Anwar challenged Hargobind to a game of chaupar. After being defeated, Anwar insulted the Guru's predecessors, and in return was beaten and sent away.

Kartarpur was defended by Bhai Bidhi Chand with Guru Hargobind and his eldest son Baba Gurdita supporting him. 

According to historian Max Macauliffe, Hargobind had "eighteen hundred regular fighting men who were supplied by his friends in Kartarpur", whilst, “The emperor had given Kale Khan fifty thousand men … Abdulla Khan … joined Kale Khan with two thousand men.” Sikh sources mention the Mughal army numbering 75,000-100,000.

20,000 of the Mughal troops attacked at night and were met with heavy resistance. Anwar Khan was felled by an arrow from Bidhi Chand.  In the morning, after serious losses overnight, Painda and Asman with there armies entered the field determined to capture the Guru. 

On seeing his ken being killed, Qutab Khan used a canon, but it did not stop the Sikhs. After Qutab Khan rushed towards the battlefield, he and Bhai Lakhu exchanged arrows, knocking each other to the ground in turn, after which Qutub took Lakhu's head with his sword. This boosted the Mughal armies morale and all the generals and the entire army charged the Sikh.

Guru Hargobind met and slew Painda in combat. The Guru spared the dying Paindas life and allowed him to recite the kalma (shahada), and shaded his body from the sun with his shield.  Gurdita felled Asman, his childhood friend, with an arrow.

Qutub and Kale  were also killed, supposedly in single combat with Guru Hargobind. After their last leader fell, the remaining Mughal troops fled. 

Macauliffe says that only two thousand Mughal soldiers remained by the end of the battle, meaning the Mughals suffered fifty thousand casualties. The Sikh only suffered seven hundred.Sikh sources say that 74,995 to 96,000 were killed.

This was the first and only battle that future Guru Tegh Bahadur had fought, and due to his valor and swordsmanship he earned the title 'Tegh' meaning large sword.

Aftermath 
After the battle, Sri Guru Hargobind Sahib travelled to Giractpur (Kirtapur) via Bhawarati (Phagwara). At Palahi village near Phagwara, he was set upon by royal forces under Ahmad Khan, and suffered considerable losses. He remained in Kiratpur until his death.

See also

Notes

References

Kartarpur
Kartarpur
1635 in India
Kartarpur